Curt Dawson (December 5, 1939 – January 13, 1985) was an American stage and television actor.

Early life
Curt Dawson was born December 5, 1939, in Russell, Kansas. He graduated from Emporia State University in 1960, and attended the Royal Academy of Dramatic Art in London, U.K.

Career
Dawson became a stage actor on Broadway. He played in Sleuth in 1973 and Absurd Person Singular in 1975. He also played in The Boys in the Band, as well as in Alice in Wonderland and The Royal Family alongside Eva Le Gallienne.

On television, Dawson acted in As the World Turns, Guiding Light, Another World, Search for Tomorrow, and The Adams Chronicles.

Personal life and death
Dawson was gay; he had relationships with author Armistead Maupin and actor Ian McKellen. He resided in SoHo, Manhattan, New York City.

Dawson died on January 13, 1985, at the Bellevue Hospital in New York City. Even though his obituary in The New York Times said he died of "complications resulting from cancer", Maupin says in his memoir, Logical Family, that he died of AIDS.

References

External links
Curt Dawson on IMDb

1940s births
1985 deaths
People from Russell, Kansas
People from SoHo, Manhattan
Emporia State University alumni
Alumni of RADA
Male actors from Kansas
American male stage actors
American male soap opera actors
Male actors from New York City
20th-century American male actors
American gay actors
LGBT people from Kansas
AIDS-related deaths in New York (state)
20th-century American LGBT people